Founded on December 26, 1979, the Polytechnic Institute of Viseu (in Portuguese Instituto Superior Politécnico de Viseu) (ISPV, colloquially IPV) is the first and only public higher education institution in the district, marking an important development milestone for the region of Viseu.

Today it is an essential reference of the city of Viseu and its entire region. From its birth until today, it has been the driving force of scientific, technological, cultural and economic development, namely through its teaching and research activities, of cultural, scientific and technological diffusion, of partnerships, inter-institutional protocols and collaborations with companies and other institutions.

The diversified range of training offered in undergraduate, master's, post-graduate and post-graduate courses and Professional Technical Courses (Cursos Técnicos Superiores Profissionais - CTeSP - in Portuguese) combined with a strategy of partnerships with the business community, educational, cultural and social of the region, provide to their graduates a rapid insertion in working life and, simultaneously, development and progress to the region and to the country.

In total, the Polytechnic Institute of Viseu has an offer of 32 undergraduate courses, 33 master's degrees, 15 postgraduate courses, 6 postgraduate degrees and 32 CTeSP, making a total of 118 courses, distributed in 5 Higher Schools.

Higher Schools and Campus 
The Polytechnic Institute of Viseu consists of five Higher Schools and a community consisting of 4944 students, 380 professors and 230 employees.

The Higher Schools that make up the ISPV are the following:
 ESEV - Escola Superior de Educação de Viseu (School of Education of Viseu) [1]
The Viseu Higher School of Education (ESEV) was the first organic unit of a Polytechnic Institute to operate in Portugal since 1983 in the emblematic building of the former School of Primary Magisterium in Viseu.

In that same year, 1983, began the first courses of teacher training.

Being one of the five organic units that make up the Polytechnic Institute of Viseu (IPV), ESEV assumes its vocation in the scientific, cultural, artistic and technical training of qualified professionals, in articulation with the provision of services to the community, research and strengthening of partnership networks with regional, national and international entities for the development of projects and activities of common interest.
 ESTGV - Escola Superior de Tecnologia e Gestão de Viseu (School of Technology and Management of Viseu) [1]
Founded in 1985, the first to be taught was the Management course in the academic year 1987/1988.

The ESTGV, as a higher education institution, is a center for the creation, diffusion and transmission of culture, science and technology, articulating its activities in the fields of education, vocational training, research and community service. The ESTGV is conducted by quality standards that ensure the adequate training to the needs of the community.
 ESAV - Escola Superior Agrária de Viseu (School of Agriculture of Viseu) [1]
It was officially founded in 1994, thus continuing the tradition, as the City of Viseu had the privilege of being a pioneer in Agricultural Education in Portugal through the creation of the Practical School of Agriculture of Viseu, by Decree of December 16, 1852.

ESAV intends to transmit and disseminate knowledge in order to train students with a high level of competences in the areas of agrarian, food and veterinary science; to promote applied research and its dissemination, cultural, scientific and technological exchange with similar national and international institutions and the relationship with the business community in order to contribute to the development of the region and the country.
 ESTGL - Escola Superior de Tecnologia e Gestão de Lamego (School of Technology and Management of Lamego) [2]
Created officially in 1999, its teaching activities began in 2000/2001, with the degrees of Management and Informatics and Tourism, Cultural and Heritage Management.

ESTGL currently lecture underdegree and a master's degree, aiming to develop other training areas equally related to management, social work, administration, tourism, IT and new technologies.
 ESSV - Escola Superior de Saúde de Viseu (School of Health of Viseu) [3]
The School of Health of Viseu is a higher education institution located in the city of Viseu, Portugal, which resulted from the reconversion of the Nursing School.

The Nursing School of Viseu was created in 1971 and began its teaching and scientific activities at the service of Nursing training in October 1974. Its integration as an Organic Unit of the Polytechnic Institute of Viseu took place in January 2001. In February 2005, was transformed into a School of Health.

Official Tuna Académica 
A tuna is a group of university students in traditional university dress who play traditional instruments and sing serenades. The tradition originated in Spain and Portugal in the 13th century as a means of students to earn money or food. Nowadays students don't belong to a "tuna" for money nor food, but seeking to keep a tradition alive, for fun, to travel a lot and to meet new people from other universities. A senior member of a tuna is a "tunante", but is usually known simply as a "tuno". The newbies/freshmen are known as "caloiros".

In the case of the Polytechnic Institute of Viseu, in 1998, the Students' Association of the School of Technology and Management of Viseu, represented by its president, gives the challenge to a former tuno from another college to found a unique tuna of the Polytechnic Institute of Viseu in order to fill an important gap in the academic life of this institution.

With the immediate collaboration of the Council of Viriato (unofficial organ of the IPV) and with the valuable contribution of many freshmen of the Institution, a journey began with the support of students, professors and employees, from the beginning intended to be a great success .

Thus, on May 3, 1998, with three months of rehearsals, the TUNA DO ISPV was born with its first public presentation at the 14th Academic Week of Viseu.

After a year, noticeably, the Academy's anthem appears. An original song, written by João João Oliveira titled "Viseu Graciosa". It is a music known to all Academy students.

On December 6, 2003, the tuna gave a show at the IPV theater, entitled  "Por ruelas e calçadas" ("By Alleys and Sidewalks"), which will lead to the release of the first CD of the tuna.

On the 6th anniversary, in 2004, the tuna decided to add to its name the designation TUNADÃO 1998, highlighting the connection to the Dão Demarcated Region and the year 1998, the year of its foundation.

In that same year was realized the first festival organized by TUNADÃO 1998, the CITADÃO. The name CITADÃO appeared in order to combine the type of event with the region where we are inserted (Certame Internacional de Tunas Académicas do Dão-Lafões). The Festival is held annually and counts on the presence of prestigious national and international tunas.

It is with great pride that the Tuna of ISPV has represented the academy and the city of Viseu throughout the country, including Azores (2006) and Madeira (2008), always carrying with them the joyful and enchanting spirit of the students.

Ten years after its formation, to commemorate a date so important and by demand of the students of the whole Academy, the Tuna Launches its second CD "De capa bem traçada", recorded in studio.

The Tuna has at this moment, with about 40 happy and jovial troubadours, being adopted a rigid hierarchy to assure the good operation of the group. This hierarchy is structured in: Tuno-Mestre, Tunos Ilustres, Tunos Doctors / Engineers / Nurses (depending on the course they attend), Tunos, Caloiros and finally Apprentice.

The Tuna appears as a bond of union between the Academy and academic life and society, serving as a link between successive generations. That is why we always intend, and as heretofore, to keep and represent the spirit of academic life, praxis and tradition.

It is with this soul, who want to animate and cheer us who will listen, who thus presents the TUNADÃO 1998 - Tuna do Instituto Superior Politécnico de Viseu.

In this institution it is prohibited to practice the praxe académica.

Culture all year-round 
 Galeria Virtual (Virtual Gallery) 
The "Galeria Virtual" of the IPV is a space for the presentation and dissemination of plastic arts.

This virtual project, of enormous scope, intends to enter in a simple way through the world of each one and touch their sensibilities. With works by several authors, some already known, others in the implementation phase, this gallery is open to disseminate the work of all those who want to do so long as they meet certain quality standards.

With approximately 8 years of activity, this project shows that it is possible to carry out culture and develop processes of approximation between cultures, in a perspective of elevation and approach of the various human societies.
 Revista Millenium - Scientific journal of the IPV 
Revista Millenium is a scientific journal published by the IPV through the Center for Education, Technology and Health Studies (CI & DETS). The journal is available for free in electronic format. It has an international importance and it is published in bilingual format.
 Polistécnica - Information Magazine of the IPV 

Founded in 2001, IPV's institutional information magazine has always appeared in print edition (quarterly at the beginning and semi-annually thereafter), and an online version is always launched.

In 2012, the IPV magazine turns the page and begins a new stage of its life, evolving to monthly edition, exclusively online version, in the form of institutional newsletter. Always with the greater aim of making all the institutional information reach your public more quickly and efficiently, closer to the event. Increasingly close to the pulse of academic life, the excellence of the research produced and the scientific, pedagogical and cultural events carried out. Without forgetting the universalistic facet of the institution, marked by the strong dynamics of international cooperation, or the contagious thrill of the associativism of its students.

However, a common trait remained: the same editorial line, with the same principles and objectives to bring to its readers all the institutional information and to constitute as another contribution of defense and cultivation of the Portuguese language.

Traje Académico de Viseu (Academic Dress of Viseu) 

In Portugal, following an ancient tradition, university regular students also use a specific dressing. The Traje Académico, as it is known in Portuguese, is recognized by its almost totally black color and cape.

See also
 Higher education in Portugal

References

External links
 http://www.ipv.pt/guide/default.htm

Polytechnics in Portugal
Viseu District
Educational institutions established in 1979
1979 establishments in Portugal